Erik Knudsen (born March 25, 1988) is a Canadian actor. He is known for portraying Daniel Matthews in Saw II, Alec Sadler in Continuum and Dale Turner in the CBS series Jericho.

Life and career
Knudsen was born on March 25, 1988 in Toronto, Ontario. His first film debut was in the 2000 film, Tribulation.

In 2001, Knudsen guest starred on The Guardian and appeared in three other episodes. He was nominated for a Young Artist Award for his performance. In 2003, Knudsen starred in the TV series Mental Block. He co-starred as Leroy "Lefty" in the film adaptation of Youth in Revolt, and in Scott Pilgrim vs. the World as Lucas "Crash" Wilson, who was the lead singer of fictional band Crash and the Boys. In 2005, he co-starred in the horror film Saw II.   From 2006 to 2008 he played the series regular role, Dale Turner in the CBS series Jericho.

Knudsen portrayed Robbie in the 2011 slasher film Scream 4. Knudsen played Ryan in The Barrens, co-starring True Blood's Stephen Moyer, which was released in late 2012.

He portrayed teen tech genius Alec Sadler in the Canadian science fiction series Continuum, starring alongside Rachel Nichols and Victor Webster, and was nominated for Best Supporting Actor for the role for two consecutive years at the Saturn Awards. He appears in Bon Cop, Bad Cop 2, the horror feature Darker Than Night, as well as Stephen King-based sci-fi TV series The Mist, and space adventure drama series Killjoys.

Filmography

Film

Television

References

External links

 

1988 births
Canadian male child actors
Canadian male film actors
Canadian male television actors
Living people
Male actors from Toronto